is a non-fiction book written by Japanese author Kunio Yanagida and published in Japan in 1975.  The book is about the Hiroshima Meteorological Observatory in 1945. Hiroshima was fully destroyed in the Atomic Bombing on August 6, 1945.

One month later, the phenomenal and powerful typhoon called Makurazaki Typhoon hit Hiroshima and resulted in 1,229 dead, 1,054 injured, and 783 missing in Hiroshima Prefecture.  This book investigated what really happened there, why the Meteorological Observatory was ineffective.  At that time, Hiroshima's administration systems were destroyed and was unable to inform the public about the typhoon.  The survivors lost their houses from the bomb and were living in barracks or hospitals.

Contents
Introduction - Enigma of the 2,000 deaths
Chapter 1 - The Flash
Chapter 2 - No Lack of the Observation
Chapter 3 - The 17th of September, 1945
Chapter 4 - The Disaster of the Research Group on Atomic Bomb from Kyoto University
Chapter 5 - The Black Rain
Last chapter - The Record of the Sandglass

See also
Hiroshima Meteorological Observatory
Atomic Bombing of Hiroshima - August 6, 1945
Makurazaki Typhoon - September 17, 1945
one of the three largest Typhoons in Shōwa period
1229 dead, 1054 injured, 783 missing in Hiroshima Prefecture

External links
A Blank in the Weather Map
Makurazaki Typhoon 
Ebayama Museum of Meteorology

1975 non-fiction books
Japanese books
History books about World War II
Books about the atomic bombings of Hiroshima and Nagasaki
Shinchosha books